Paddington 2 is a 2017 live-action animated comedy film directed by Paul King and written by King and Simon Farnaby. Based on the stories of Paddington Bear, created by Michael Bond (to whom the film is also dedicated, Bond having died that year), it is the sequel to Paddington (2014), and is produced by Heyday Films and StudioCanal UK. The film, a British-French-Luxembourgish co-production, stars Ben Whishaw as the voice of Paddington, with Hugh Bonneville, Sally Hawkins, Brendan Gleeson, Julie Walters, Jim Broadbent, Peter Capaldi, and Hugh Grant in live-action roles. In the film, Paddington tries to get a present for his adoptive aunt's birthday, but when the intended gift is stolen from a shop and he is wrongfully convicted and imprisoned for the theft, he and his family have to find the real culprit and prove Paddington's innocence.

The film was confirmed to be in development in April 2015. Principal photography began in October 2016 and ended in June 2017. The film was theatrically released on 10 November 2017 in the United Kingdom and 6 December 2017 in France, and grossed $227 million worldwide. The film received widespread critical acclaim on Metacritic and gained an approval rating of 100% on Rotten Tomatoes, becoming the highest-rated film on the site until a single negative review was registered in 2021. It is widely considered one of the best films of the 2010s, for both children and adults. It received three nominations at the 71st British Academy Film Awards: Outstanding British Film, Best Adapted Screenplay and Best Actor in a Supporting Role, for Grant. A third film, Paddington in Peru, is in development.

Plot 

Paddington, having settled with the Brown family in Windsor Gardens, has become popular in his community, offering people emotional support in various ways. To purchase a unique pop-up book of London in Samuel Gruber's antique shop for his aunt Lucy's 100th birthday, Paddington performs several odd jobs and saves his wages, but Gruber's shop is burgled and the book is stolen. Paddington gives chase, but the thief escapes, and Paddington is framed. The thief returns home and is revealed to be Phoenix Buchanan, an egotistical actor who lives near the Browns. In court, although Gruber states that he does not believe that Paddington stole the book, with no evidence of the thief's existence, Paddington is convicted and sent to prison.

While in prison, Paddington befriends many of the inmates, including the short-tempered chef Knuckles, who recruits Paddington, impressed by his marmalade sandwich recipe. The Browns work to clear Paddington's name, putting up sketches of the thief. Buchanan uses the book to locate a series of clues within London's landmarks, which he believes will unveil the location of a secret treasure. During their efforts to prove Paddington's innocence, the Browns encounter a fortune teller who informs them that the book leads to the hidden fortune of the original author.

With Paddington inside, the prison is a much livelier place, but Paddington struggles to remain positive when the Browns are unable to prove his innocence, but keep hunting. Knuckles, Phibs and Spoon later tell Paddington that although the Browns mean well, they will eventually forget about him.

Becoming convinced that Buchanan is the culprit, the Browns look for the stolen book inside his house. They find a secret attic where Buchanan's various costumes are stashed, including the costume of the thief. Buchanan returns home and they are forced to leave. Meanwhile, the Browns' investigation causes them to miss visiting Paddington in prison.

Paddington, thinking that the Browns have in fact forgotten him, joins Knuckles, Phibs and Spoon in a prison break. They promise to aid in proving his innocence, but after escaping, they promptly abandon the idea in order to leave the country, inviting Paddington to join them. Paddington refuses and, while avoiding the police, uses a public telephone to contact the Browns, who assert that Buchanan is the real culprit. To catch him, they arrange to meet at Paddington Station, where a carnival train carrying the supposed location of the hidden fortune is due to leave.

Paddington reaches the station, disguising himself as a litter bin to avoid the police, and boards the train just as it leaves. The Browns pursue on a LNER Peppercorn Class A1, at the opposite platform. Buchanan finds the hidden fortune, but is thwarted by Paddington. Henry, Judy and Mrs. Bird catch up and board the other train to confront Buchanan, who overwhelms them and escapes. He severs the coupling of the train's rear carriage (with Paddington locked inside), but is photographed by Judy while holding the book, before Henry knocks him out.

Paddington is still trapped in the rear carriage when it derails and crashes into a nearby river. Mary tries to rescue Paddington but struggles to open the locked carriage; she is soon assisted by Knuckles and the other inmates, who had a change of heart and decide to help Paddington as promised.

Paddington becomes very ill and falls into a coma, but wakes up on Lucy's birthday. He learns that he has been exonerated, and that Buchanan has been arrested. He is disappointed that he cannot give Lucy the book, which was taken in as evidence, but discovers that the Browns, with the help of various other people in the neighbourhood, made sure Lucy could come to London and see it for herself. When answering the door to her, Paddington rushes up and hugs her, wishing her a happy birthday.

During the credits, Knuckles, Phibs, and Spoon are pardoned, and Knuckles opens a sandwich business. Buchanan is sentenced to 10 years in prison; six months later, he is shown to be putting his experience as a performer to further use by hosting shows for the inmates and providing entertainment throughout the building. The book was handed over to the Browns after it was released from the authorities.

Cast 
Main cast
 Hugh Bonneville as Henry Brown
 Sally Hawkins as Mary Brown
 Hugh Grant as Phoenix Buchanan
 Brendan Gleeson as Knuckles McGinty
 Madeleine Harris as Judy Brown
 Samuel Joslin as Jonathan "J-Dog" Brown
 Julie Walters as Mrs. Bird
 Jim Broadbent as Samuel Gruber
 Peter Capaldi as Mr. Curry
Voices
 Ben Whishaw as Paddington Brown
 Imelda Staunton as Aunt Lucy
 Michael Gambon as Uncle Pastuzo

Supporting cast
 Joanna Lumley as Felicity Fanshaw
 Eileen Atkins as Madame Kozlova
 Ben Miller as Colonel Lancaster
 Simon Farnaby as Barry
 Jessica Hynes as Miss Kitts
 Noah Taylor as Phibs
 Aaron Neil as Spoon
 Tom Davis as T-Bone
 Tom Conti as Judge Gerald Biggleswade
 Sanjeev Bhaskar as Dr. Jafri
 Marie-France Alvarez as Mademoiselle Dubois
 Robbie Gee as Mr. Barnes
 Maggie Steed as Gertrude Biggleswade
 Richard Ayoade as a Forensic Investigator
 Meera Syal as a Prosecutor
 Enzo Squillino Jr. as Mr Giuseppe
 Jamie Demetriou as The Professor

Production 
In April 2015, David Heyman, the producer of Paddington (2014), confirmed that a sequel was in development. It was also announced that Paul King would return to direct, and co-write the screenplay with Simon Farnaby. Heyman's Heyday Films, and StudioCanal, produced the film, making it a British-French co-production. By October 2016, most of the cast of Paddington — Hugh Bonneville, Sally Hawkins, Julie Walters, Jim Broadbent, Peter Capaldi, Madeleine Harris, Samuel Joslin, Ben Whishaw and Imelda Staunton — were confirmed to be returning for the sequel, joined by Hugh Grant and Brendan Gleeson. Grant described his character as "enormously vain and narcissistic".

Principal photography began on 18 October. Many of the domestic interiors were filmed on stages at Pinewood Studios and Warner Bros. Studios, Leavesden, but producers also shot at key central London locations like Tower Bridge and St Paul's Cathedral. Jonah Coombes, supervising location on both Paddington and the sequel, stated, “We were looking for locations that celebrated London and delivered the kind of cinematic scale we were looking for.” Framestore provided the visual effects for the film, including the elaborate pop-up book sequence. On 7 February 2017, filming featured in the CBBC documentary series All Over the Workplace. Filming took place in London's Little Venice for three days, and also at Shepton Mallet Prison and Knebworth Park. Craig Revel Horwood choreographed the prison dance scene. Principal photography wrapped on 27 June 2017. Michael Bond, the creator of Paddington Bear, died the same day, and the film was dedicated to him.

Soundtrack 
The music of the film was composed by Dario Marianelli.

Additional music in the film, not included on the soundtrack recording:

"Rain on the Roof" (Stephen Sondheim) – Hugh Grant; performed during the end credits.

Release 
Paddington 2 had its world premiere in London on 5 November 2017, and was theatrically released in the United Kingdom on 10 November. It was released on 6 December in France, 7 December in Germany, 21 December in Australia and New Zealand, and 12 January 2018 in the United States.

Distribution 
StudioCanal distributed Paddington 2 in the United Kingdom, France, Germany, Australia and New Zealand. The film was originally set to be distributed by The Weinstein Company and Dimension Films in the United States through their sub-label, TWC-Dimension, as the last film was. Following the sexual abuse allegations against Weinstein Company founder Harvey Weinstein, Heyday Films and StudioCanal looked for another American distributor for Paddington 2, because they believed that a film for children should not be associated with the Weinstein scandal. In mid-November 2017, Warner Bros. Pictures, which distributed Heyday's Harry Potter films and was already distributing the Paddington films in Spain, acquired the film's North American distribution rights for $32 million (£24 million). Warner Bros. also has the right of first refusal to distribute future Paddington films in North America.

Marketing 
From 9 October 2017, five pop-up installations of Paddington's pop-up book, featured in the film, were placed around London, at Peter's Hill, Tower Bridge, Paddington Station, Peninsula Square and Bankside. The event was promoted by Visit London. The launch was attended by Hugh Bonneville and Mayor of London, Sadiq Khan.

On 16 October 2017, Prince William, Duke of Cambridge and Catherine, Duchess of Cambridge attended a Paddington 2 charity event at Paddington Station, along with some of the cast and crew of the film. A video game based on the film, Paddington Run, was released on iOS, Android and Windows Phone devices on 25 October 2017.

On 26 October 2017, it was announced that Paddington would appear in the 2017 Marks & Spencer Christmas advertisement. A teaser was released on 4 November 2017. The advertisement itself was released on 7 November 2017 and had its television premiere on the Pride of Britain Awards 2017. Whishaw returned to voice Paddington, and the advertisement also featured Mark Benton and Angela Rippon.

Home media 
Paddington 2 was released on streaming platform Amazon Video on 5 March 2018. The film was released in the United Kingdom on Blu-ray, DVD & 4K Ultra HD Blu-ray on 12 March 2018. The film was released on Blu-ray and DVD in the United States on 24 April 2018 from Warner Bros. Home Entertainment.

Reception

Box office 
Paddington 2 grossed $40.9 million in the United States and Canada, and $186.4 million in other countries (including $59.4 million in the United Kingdom), for a worldwide total of $227.3 million.

In its first weekend in the United Kingdom, the film grossed $10.9 million (£8.3 million), more than the first film ($8/£6 million), becoming StudioCanal's highest-grossing film opening weekend in the United Kingdom to date. In its second weekend, the film dropped 20% and grossed another $8.8 million (£6.6 million).

In the United States and Canada, Paddington 2 was released alongside the openings of The Commuter and Proud Mary, as well as the wide expansion of The Post, and was projected to gross $15–17 million from 3,702 theatres in opening weekend. It made $2.4 million on its first day and $11 million over the weekend (including $15 million over the four-day Martin Luther King Jr. weekend), finishing 7th at the box office, and marking a near-50% decline from the opening of the first film. It made $8 million in its second weekend, dropping 27% and finishing 6th.

Critical response 
On review aggregator Rotten Tomatoes, Paddington 2 has an approval rating of 99% based on 252 reviews, with an average rating of 8.7/10. The website's critical consensus reads, "Paddington 2 honours its star's rich legacy with a sweet-natured sequel whose adorable visuals are matched by a story perfectly balanced between heartwarming family fare and purely enjoyable all-ages adventure." On 18 January 2018, it became the most-reviewed film ever to remain at 100% on the site, with 164 positive reviews, beating Toy Story 2, which had 163 positive reviews at the time. Lady Bird had previously beaten the record the past November, but registered a negative review at 196. In 2021, the 100% score for Citizen Kane (1941), often regarded as the greatest film ever made, was changed to 99% following the inclusion of an 80-year-old negative review; some publications satirically labelled Paddington 2 as a better film than Citizen Kane due to their respective scores. In May 2021, Paddington 2 score dropped to 99% after a negative review from 2021 was registered on the site.

On Metacritic, another review aggregator, the film has a weighted average score of 88 out of 100 based on 38 critics, indicating "universal acclaim". On French entertainment information publisher AlloCiné, the film has an average grade of 4.0/5 based on 22 critics. Audiences polled by CinemaScore gave the film an average grade of "A" on an A+ to F scale, the same score earned by its predecessor.

Leslie Felperin of The Hollywood Reporter wrote, "Paddington 2 won't save the world, sadly, but its existence makes everything just that tiny bit better and more, well, bearable." Guy Lodge of Variety wrote, "Another near pawfect family entertainment, honouring the cosy, can-do spirit of Michael Bond's stories while bringing them smoothly into a bustling, diverse 21st century London — with space for some light anti-Brexit subtext to boot." Peter Bradshaw of The Guardian wrote, "The film is pitched with insouciant ease and a lightness of touch at both children and adults without any self-conscious shifts in irony or tone: it's humour with the citrus tang of top quality thick-cut marmalade." In 2019, The Guardian ranked Paddington 2 the 69th best film of the 21st century.

Accolades

Future

Television series
On 9 October 2017, StudioCanal announced that they were producing The Adventures of Paddington, an animated series based on the film, with Whishaw reprising his role as Paddington. The series premiered worldwide on Nickelodeon in 2020.

Sequel
In June 2016, StudioCanal CEO Didier Lupfer stated that the studio was committed to making a third Paddington film. In November 2017, David Heyman told Digital Spy that though the script for a third film had not been developed, discussions about locations, ideas and scenes had already begun. In November 2018, Heyman noted that a third film was likely to happen, but that Paul King would not be back to direct due to him working on Wonka, though he would still be involved in a prominent creative capacity. In February 2021, Paddington 3 officially began development.

In July 2021, StudioCanal announced that Paddington 3 will begin shooting in the first quarter of 2022. The story for the third film was written by Paul King, Simon Farnaby, and Mark Burton, and the screenplay by Burton, Jon Foster and James Lamont. In June 2022, the film's title Paddington in Peru and Dougal Wilson as director were announced, with principal photography now set to begin 2023.

References in other media 
 In the 2022 film, The Unbearable Weight of Massive Talent, Nicolas Cage (playing a fictionalised version of himself) watches Paddington 2 for the first time whilst bonding with another character, Javi (Pedro Pascal) who says the film "made him want to be a better man". Whilst at first being sceptical, Cage subsequently falls in love with the film.

See also 
 List of films with a 100% rating on Rotten Tomatoes, a film review aggregator website
 List of films considered the best

References

External links 

 
 
 

2010s British films
2010s children's comedy films
2010s English-language films
2010s fantasy comedy films
2010s French films
2017 comedy films
2017 films
Animated films set in England
Animated films set in London
British children's adventure films
British children's comedy films
British children's fantasy films
British prison films
British sequel films
Films about actors
Films about bears
Films about books
Films about families
Films about miscarriage of justice
Films about prison escapes
Films based on British novels
Films based on children's books
Films directed by Paul King (director)
Films produced by David Heyman
Films scored by Dario Marianelli
Films set in amusement parks
Films set in England
Films set in London
Films set on trains
Films shot at Pinewood Studios
Films shot at Warner Bros. Studios, Leavesden
Films shot in England
Films shot in Hertfordshire
Films shot in London
Films shot in Somerset
Films using motion capture
Films with live action and animation
French children's films
French comedy films
French fantasy films
French sequel films
Paddington Bear
StudioCanal animated films
StudioCanal films